Vaida Žūsinaitė-Nekriošienė (born 13 January 1988) is a long-distance runner who competes internationally for Lithuania.

In 2012, she represented Lithuania in the European Championships, where she finished 19th. Žūsinaitė met the qualification standards for the 2015 World Championships in Athletics, but might not be selected due to the three runners per nation rule.  Five female Lithuanian marathon runners met the qualification standards. 2016 she broke her personal best in Hannover Marathon (2:32,50) and represented Lithuania in 2016 Summer Olympics., where she finished 38th (2:35,53).

Personal bests

References

External links
 
 
 
 
 
 

1988 births
Living people
Lithuanian female marathon runners
Lithuanian female long-distance runners
Lithuanian female steeplechase runners
Olympic athletes of Lithuania
Athletes (track and field) at the 2016 Summer Olympics